Voldemārs is a Latvian masculine given name. It is a cognate of the Germanic "Waldemar".

Voldemārs may refer to:
Voldemārs Elmūts (1910–1966), Latvian basketball player
Voldemārs Lūsis (born 1974), Latvian athlete, javelin thrower, Olympic competitor
Voldemārs Mežgailis (1912-1998), Latvian chess master
Voldemārs Ozols (1884-1949), Latvian military commander, military theorist and politician
Voldemārs Plade (1900-????), Latvian football forward and football manager
Voldemārs Reinholds (1903-1986), Latvian Waffen SS soldier 
Voldemārs Sudmalis (1922-1990,) Latvian football defender
Voldemārs Veiss (1899-1944), Latvian soldier and Nazi collaborator
Voldemārs Vītols (1911–1980), Latvian middle-distance runner
Voldemārs Zāmuēls (1872-1948), Latvian politician, former Prime Minister of Latvia
Voldemārs Žins (1905-????), Latvian footballer

Latvian masculine given names